The True Story of the 3 Little Pigs! is a children's book by Jon Scieszka and Lane Smith. Released in a number of editions since its first release by Viking Kestrel, an imprint of Viking Penguin in 1989, it is a parody of The Three Little Pigs as told by the Big Bad Wolf, known in the book as "A. Wolf", short for "Alexander T. Wolf". The book was honored by the American Library Association as an ALA Notable Book.

Plot
This story starts with a wolf named Alexander T. introducing himself, claiming that the story everyone knows is wrong, and that he was unjustly framed. He tells it from his perspective: he was making a cake for his grandmother but ran out of sugar and didn't have enough money to buy more. He then tries to ask one of his neighbors for a cup of sugar, a pig (which is the first little pig), whom he accidentally killed due to his sneezing knocking down his house. The first pig — who was in the straw house — was not in, while the second pig — who was in the stick house — was "shaving the hairs on his chinny chin-chin". The wolf then eats the pig, then he tries to ask the second pig whom he accidentally kills too. He then asks the final pig (who had a whole sack full of sugar). The third pig (who may have heard his brothers being eaten alive, and thus assumes Alexander is now after him too) talks impolite to him. Alexander then goes insane after the pig insults his grandmother. Policemen pigs heard about the news and accused Alexander of causing havoc (mainly due to the fact that the reporters felt a story about a wolf with a sneezing cold looking for sugar was too boring). Then Alexander is taken captive and is sentenced to ten thousand years in pig prison (that is, for the destruction of the pigs's houses, murder of the first two and attempted murder of the third). At the end, the wolf suggests that maybe the reader would loan him a cup of sugar.

Critical reception
Based on a 2007 online poll, the National Education Association listed the book as one of its "Teachers' Top 100 Books for Children". It was one of the "Top 100 Picture Books" of all time in a 2012 poll by School Library Journal.

Adaptation
This book was later adapted into a Weston Woods Studios animated short in 2008 with Paul Giamatti as the wolf.

See also
 The Three Little Wolves and the Big Bad Pig, another inverted version of the story

Notes

1989 children's books
American children's books
American picture books
Parody books
Fairy tale parodies
Big Bad Wolf
Picture books based on fairy tales
Works based on The Three Little Pigs
Books about pigs
Books about wolves
Fiction with unreliable narrators
Viking Press books